This article contains records for men's Twenty20 Internationals.

Listing notation 
Team notation
 (100/3) indicates that a team scored 100 runs for three wickets and the innings was closed, either due to a successful run chase or if no overs remained (or are able) to be bowled.
 (100) indicates that a team scored 100 runs and was all out, either by losing all ten wickets or by having one or more batsmen unable to bat and losing the remaining wickets.

Batting notation
 (100*) indicates a batsman scored 100 runs and was not out.
 (75) indicates that a batsman scored 75 runs and was out after that.

Bowling notation
 (5/40) indicates that a bowler has captured 5 wickets while giving away 40 runs.
 (19.5 overs) indicates that a team bowled 19 complete overs (each of six legal deliveries), and one incomplete over of just five deliveries.

Currently playing

Team records

Team wins, losses, ties and no results

Result records

Highest margin of victory (by runs)

Highest margin of victory (by balls remaining)

Highest margin of victory (by wickets) 

As of 26 February 2023, a total of 45 matches have been won by a margin of 10 wickets.

Smallest margin of victory (by runs)
As of 16 December 2022, a total of 23 matches have been won by a margin of 1 run.

Smallest margin of victory (by wicket)

As of 2 December 2022, a total of 10 matches have been won by a margin of 1 wicket.

Smallest margin of victory (by balls remaining)
As of 2 December 2022, teams batting second have won on the last ball of the match on 37 occasions.

Tied matches

Most consecutive wins by a team

Most consecutive matches without victory

Team scoring records

Highest innings totals

Highest successful chases

Highest innings total batting second

Highest match aggregate

Lowest innings totals

Shortest completed innings (by balls)

Lowest match aggregate

Most sixes in an innings

Most fours in an innings

Most sixes in a match

Most fours in a match

Individual records (batting)

Most career runs

Most runs in each batting position

Fastest to multiples of 1,000 runs

Highest individual score

Highest individual score (by batting position)

Highest individual score (progression of record)

Highest career average

Highest average in each batting position

Highest career strike rate

Most 50+ scores

Fastest 50

Fastest 100

Most career sixes

Most career fours

Highest strike rate in an innings

Most sixes in an innings

Most fours in an innings

Most runs off an over

Most runs in a calendar year

Most runs in a series

Most career ducks

Individual records (bowling)

Most wickets in a career

Fastest to multiples of 50 wickets

Best figures in a match

Best career averages

Best career economy rate

Best career strike rate

Most four-wickets-in-an-innings (and over) in a career

Best economy rate in an innings

Best strike rate in an innings

Most runs conceded in an innings

Most wickets in a calendar year

Most wickets in a series

Hat-tricks

Individual records (fielding)

Most catches in T20I career

Individual records (wicket-keeper)

Most dismissals in career

Most catches in career

Most stumpings in career

Individual records (others)

Most matches played in career

Most matches played as captain

Most matches won as captain

Oldest players

Oldest debutant

Youngest players

Most consecutive matches played

Most player-of-the-match awards

Most player-of-the-series awards

Partnership records

Highest overall partnership runs by a pair

Highest partnerships (any wicket)

Highest partnerships (by wicket)

Individual records (officials)

Most matches as an umpire

Most matches as a match referee

See also
 List of Test cricket records
 List of One Day International cricket records
 List of women's Twenty20 International records

Notes

References

International
Records